Ganiga is a caste found in the state of Karnataka, India. They were originally oil pressers and also oil-mongers in the Mysore region of Karnataka. They are classified as OBC in India's system of positive discrimination.

References

Social groups of Karnataka
Oil pressing castes
Other Backward Classes